UKF may refer to:

 Unscented Kalman filter, a special case of an algorithm to handle measurements containing noise and other inaccuracies
 UK funky, a genre of electronic dance music from the United Kingdom
 UKF Music, an electronic music brand based in the United Kingdom
 United Kingdom First, a small short-lived populist, Eurosceptic British political party
 Univerzita Konštantína Filozofa, a university in Nitra, Slovakia